Kyaw Thaung (born 9 May 1949) is a Burmese politician and former political prisoner who currently serves as an Amyotha Hluttaw MP for Sagaing Region No. 1 Constituency. He is a member of the National League for Democracy.

Early life and education
Kyaw Thaung was born on 9 May 1949 in Sitee Village, Sagaing Township, Myanmar. He graduated with a B.Sc degree in chemistry from Mandalay University. His previous job was at a youth computer centre.

In 1996, Kyaw Thuang was arrested and sentenced to 7 years with hard labor under Section 5 for his criticism of the SLORC National Democratic committee. In 2003, he was arrested for the second time in relation to the Tabayin uprising at Monywa prison.

Political career
Kyaw Thuang is a member of the National League for Democracy. In the 2015 Myanmar general election, he was elected as an Amyotha Hluttaw MP, winning a majority of 209486 votes and elected representative from Sagaing Region No. 1 parliamentary constituency.

References

National League for Democracy politicians
1949 births
Living people
People from Sagaing Region
Sagaing Township
Mandalay University alumni